Giambattista Leni (1573–1627) was a Roman Catholic cardinal.on consistory of November 24, 1608 was created cardinal by Pope Paul V

Biography
On 20 Jul 1608, he was consecrated bishop by Ottavio Paravicini, Cardinal-Priest of Sant'Alessio, with Marco Cornaro, Bishop of Padua, and Diego Alvarez, Archbishop of Trani, serving as co-consecrators.

Much of the initial construction of the Barnabite's church in Rome, San Carlo ai Catinari, was done at Leni's personal expense.

Episcopal succession
While bishop, he was the principal consecrator of:

and the principal co-consecrator of:
Michelangelo Tonti, Titular Archbishop of Nazareth (1608).

References

1573 births
1627 deaths
17th-century Italian cardinals
17th-century Italian Roman Catholic bishops